Elwood Gordon Gee (born February 2, 1944), known as E. Gordon Gee, is an American academic. As of 2020, he was serving his second term as President of West Virginia University; his first term was from 1981 to 1985. Gee has held more university presidencies than any other American. He was head of University of Colorado Boulder from 1985 to 1990, of Ohio State University from 1990 to 1997, of Brown University from 1998 to 2000, of Vanderbilt University from 2000 to 2007, and of Ohio State University for a second time from 2007 to 2013. Time rated Gee one of the top 10 college presidents in the United States for 2010.

Gee stepped down from the Ohio State presidency on July 1, 2013, in response to a series of controversies relating to comments he made, the last of which involved anti-Catholic comments allegedly made in jest about the University of Notre Dame. He then headed an Ohio State-based think tank before returning to West Virginia University.

Early life, education, and early career 

Gee was born and grew up in Vernal, Utah, 171 miles (275 km) east of Salt Lake City, the son of an oil company employee and a school teacher. Raised a Mormon, he served a mission in Germany and Italy. Gee is an Eagle Scout and a recipient of the Distinguished Eagle Scout Award. Gee attended the University of Utah and graduated with a B.A. in history in 1968. After earning a J.D. from Columbia University Law School in 1971 and an Ed.D. from Teachers College, Columbia University in 1972, Gee was named a judicial fellow and staff assistant to the Supreme Court for one year.

After clerking for Chief Justice of the United States Warren Burger, Gee accepted a position as professor and associate dean at Brigham Young University in Provo, Utah. He became dean and professor at West Virginia University's law school in 1979, and president of the university two years later. As president of a university at age 37, he was one of the youngest chief executives in academia at the time.

Brown University 
Gee was president of Brown for only two years, and his tenure was mired in controversy. According to The Village Voice and The College Hill Independent, one of the university's campus newspapers, Gee was criticized by students and faculty for treating the school like a Wall Street corporation rather than an Ivy League university.

Critics pointed to his decisions to sign off on an ambitious brain science program without consulting the faculty, to sell $80 million in bonds for the construction of a biomedical sciences building, and to cut the university's extremely popular Charleston String Quartet, which many saw as part of Gee's effort to lead the school away from its close but unprofitable relationship with the arts.

Gee left under a storm of criticism in 2000, as members of the Brown community widely accused him of departing from the school after an uncommonly short tenure because of Vanderbilt University's offer of a corporate-level salary and a tenured teaching position for his wife. According to a 2003 article by The Chronicle of Higher Education, Gee was the second highest paid university chief executive in the country with a purported total compensation package of more than $1.3 million.

Gee's tumultuous tenure at Brown is commemorated annually with the "E. Gordon Gee Lavatory Complex," a collection of portable toilets that appears during Spring Weekend.

Vanderbilt University 
Gee enjoyed a relatively calm tenure at Vanderbilt compared to Brown. He was generally well liked by faculty and students, demonstrated by his high student approval ratings. In 2005, when Gee's approval saw a comparatively sharp drop, it still stood at 88.4%. During his tenure, Vanderbilt saw a dramatic increase in student applications— more than 50% in six years—and a rise in the SAT scores of incoming freshmen. Under his tenure, the university completed a $1.25 billion fundraising campaign two years ahead of schedule.

A September 2006 The Wall Street Journal article detailed that some of Gee's problems at Vanderbilt—including his wife's actions (such as smoking marijuana in the chancellor's official residence), criticism of the high cost of renovating his home, and the couple's lavish spending—had come back to haunt him. Additionally, Gee's 2002 announcement that the administration was going to rename Confederate Memorial Hall without the word Confederate provoked a series of lawsuits. While Vanderbilt's board expressed some concern about Gee's spending, they also strongly endorsed his successful leadership. According to the Chronicle of Higher Education, he received a total compensation of over $1.8 million in 2005/6, the highest of any continuing university president in the United States.

On March 11, 2003, a student satirical publication at Vanderbilt, The Slant, ran a complete mock-up of The Vanderbilt Hustler, entitled The Vanderbilt Huslter, with the headline "GEE DEAD". The hoax received some attention from national media, including an appearance on the Drudge Report. Gee's office responded to the hoax by releasing a photo of him holding a copy of the Huslter (with Gee smiling). Despite Gee's good humor about the prank, the ensuing controversy led to the removal of The Slant's sophomore editor-in-chief David Barzelay from his post for inappropriately expropriating the Vanderbilt Hustler's news racks in violation of Vanderbilt Student Communications regulations. Gee discussed the hoax in his 2003 commencement speech.
In September 2003, Gee made national headlines when he eliminated the organized athletic department at Vanderbilt and consolidated its activities under the Division of Student Life, the university's general administrative division for student organizations and activities. Some critics cited this reorganization in the recruiting process to call into question Vanderbilt's commitment to football. However, Gee's action had its supporters, including NCAA President Myles Brand.  Furthermore, a stellar spring for Vanderbilt athletic teams and a top-30 finish in the National Association of Collegiate Directors of Athletics (NACDA) Director's Cup ranking of college athletic programs for the 2003–04 academic year provided some vindication for Vanderbilt and Gee.

Ohio State University
On July 11, 2007, Gee announced that he would be returning to Ohio State University as its president, ending his 7-year tenure at Vanderbilt. According to The Chronicle of Higher Education, he was to receive a base salary of total compensation of over $1 million, the highest of any public university president in the United States, though less than his pay at Vanderbilt.

Controversy arose over Gee's alleged usage of public money to live an extravagant lifestyle. The Dayton Daily News of Dayton, Ohio, reported that "Ohio State has spent more than $64,000 on bow ties, bow tie cookies and O-H and bow tie pins for Gee and others to distribute."

Gee repeatedly came under fire from the media following public statements of his. In 2010, Gee stated, when talking about the rather weaker schedules of mid-major football programs Boise State and TCU compared to the schedules of Ohio State and other Big Ten and SEC programs, "I do know, having been both a Southeastern Conference president and a Big Ten president, that it's like murderer's row every week for these schools. We do not play the Little Sisters of the Poor. We play very fine schools on any given day". Gee would later apologize for his comments about this well established Roman Catholic Congregation, who have been operating in the United States since 1868.  He later visited the Little Sisters of the Poor, and claimed he did not know about the organization when he made the comments. TCU ended up getting the last laugh, winning the 2011 Rose Bowl; following the win, a group of TCU alumni paid for space on several digital billboards in the Columbus area in which the "Little Sisters of the Poor" congratulated TCU on its victory.

In 2011, Gee came under fire again for anti-Polish sentiment after comparing being the president at Ohio State to running the Polish army. Gee would later regret making the comment after Polish-American groups strongly responded to his joke about their ethnicity.  In response to Gee's remarks, the Polish American Congress released a statement demanding Gee's apology. "The Polish American Congress is shocked by the slanderous analogy used by Ohio State University President Gordon Gee and his slur on the military of a nation that has been fighting valiantly and effectively alongside the United States in Iraq and Afghanistan... We are dismayed by the bigotry and ignorance expressed by the president of such a large and prominent American university, especially since Ohio has a large Polish-American population and many OSU students are of Polish heritage. President Gee needs to apologize for his remarks. " said a statement from Susanne S. Lotarski, vice president for public relations at Polish American Congress.

In December 2012 Gee made offensive anti-Catholic statements. Gee said that the University of Notre Dame should not be added to the Big Ten:  On March 11, 2013, Ohio State University trustees sent Gee a letter complaining that he had embarrassed the school with his comments. The anti-defamation chair of the Ancient Order of Hibernians responded with shock that it took six months for Gee to apologize, saying that "this delayed action smacks of damage control for the media, rather than a sincere effort to address a bigoted insult to Catholics."

Bill Donohue of the Catholic League took a more sympathetic tack regarding the issue: "It's time for everyone to take a deep breath," he commented. "I have never met President Gee, but it is clear from what I read that what he said was made in jest. Was it dumb? ... yes. But context and tone matter, as does the frequency of what may be considered an offensive remark: a real bigot is someone who repeatedly, and maliciously, attacks others. Gee is not such a man. Political correctness has gone too far."

The Ohio State trustees also felt that Gee made insensitive public comments about the University of Cincinnati, University of Kentucky, University of Louisville, and the Southeastern Conference. The letter laid out the steps Gee must take, which included issuing personal apologies and obtaining professional help to improve personal communications and speech writing processes. Shortly thereafter, the full text of Gee's remarks became public, and it was revealed that during the same speech, he had also taken shots at former Wisconsin football head coach Bret Bielema, saying "[Wisconsin athletic director] Barry Alvarez thought he was a thug." When asked about the SEC and Louisville saying the Big Ten couldn't count after the conference added Maryland and Rutgers during the early-2010s conference realignment to expand the conference to 14 teams, Gee ridiculed the academic standards of Louisville and the SEC schools, saying once they "learned to read and write", they could start thinking about conference expansion. Gee released an official apology and called his words a poor attempt at humor.

Gee's base salary was $802,125, with a total compensation package of $1.6 million. In 2009, he donated a $200,531 bonus and his $20,053 raise to scholarship funds.

In 2013, Gee earned $6,057,615 from Ohio State University.

On June 4, 2013, Gee announced his retirement. In a news release, he said, "After much deliberation, I have decided it is now time for me to turn over the reins of leadership to allow the seeds that we have planted to grow. It is also time for me to reenergize and refocus myself."

West Virginia University 
On December 5, 2013, West Virginia University announced that Gee would become its interim president until the search for a permanent president concluded. Following an endorsement by the West Virginia University presidential search committee on February 28, 2014, Gee was appointed by the Board of Governors at WVU on March 3 to be the University's 24th permanent president. BOG Chair James W. Dailey II said about Gee, "It is clear Gordon Gee has not been a placeholder president by any means; he has been an extraordinary high energy leader who is getting things done, moving [WVU] forward and clearly has the support of our Board, senior University leaders, faculty and staff, students, elected officials, higher education peers and opinion leaders."

Personal life 
Gee has been married twice. His first wife was Elizabeth D. Gee, with whom he had one daughter, Rebekah Gee. Gee and his daughter were featured on an episode of the public radio show This American Life discussing life after Elizabeth's death.  Gee divorced his second wife, Constance Bumgarner Gee, in 2007. During the summer of 2016, Gee became engaged to Laurie Erickson of the Erickson Foundation. Gee's daughter Rebekah was appointed Secretary of the Louisiana Department of Health and Hospitals in 2016.

In 2001, Gee received the Judge Elbert P. Tuttle Distinguished Achievement Award, the highest recognition of achievement in the Pi Kappa Alpha International fraternity. In 2012, Gee became the first Honorary Esteemed Member of the University of Colorado's Buff Bow Tie Bunch (BBTB).

Gee has donated more than $10,000 to Democratic and Republican political campaigns since 2010.

Gee served on the board of directors of L Brands.

References 

1944 births
Living people
American educational theorists
Latter Day Saints from Utah
American Mormon missionaries in Germany
American Mormon missionaries in Italy
Brigham Young University faculty
Chancellors of Vanderbilt University
Columbia Law School alumni
People from Vernal, Utah
Presidents of Brown University
Presidents of Ohio State University
Presidents of the University of Colorado System
Teachers College, Columbia University alumni
20th-century Mormon missionaries
University of Utah alumni
Latter Day Saints from Ohio
Presidents of West Virginia University
Latter Day Saints from West Virginia
Latter Day Saints from Colorado
Latter Day Saints from Tennessee
Latter Day Saints from Rhode Island